The Statutes of Canada (SC) compiles, by year, all the laws passed by the Parliament of Canada since Confederation in 1867. The Revised Statutes of Canada (RSC) consolidates current federal laws in force, incorporating amendments into acts, adding new substantive acts enacted since the last revision and deleting rescinded acts. Thus far there have been six revisions: in 1886, 1906, 1927, 1952, 1970, and 1985. The Statutes of Canada are its own legal code. They are the federal legal code of Canada that contains the federal laws and statutes enacted by the Parliament of Canada, and are enacted into their own unified code. The Statutes of Canada are organized by alphabetical order and are updated and amended by the Government of Canada from time to time.

Publication of statutes
At the time that the Interpretation Act (1867) was passed, the Statutes of Canada were required to be distributed and published at the end of each session of parliament. This was changed in 1984, with the volumes of the Statutes of Canada being required to be distributed and published at the end of each calendar year. Acts in the Statutes volumes are referred to as "Annual Statutes."

After public acts are passed but before they are compiled in the Statutes, they are published in Part III of the Canada Gazette every three months.

See also
 Canada Gazette
 CanLII

References

External links
 RSC 1886, volume 1
 RSC 1886, volume 2

Main